The CAN Bayonet 2000/2005 is the up-to-date standard multi-purpose infantry bayonet of the Canadian Armed Forces, issued to match the C7/C8 service rifles as the successor of C7 Nella Bayonet after replacing the C7 Nella Bayonet after 2004.

Description 
The CAN bayonet 2000/2005 is a German-designed Canadian bayonet manufactured under licence by Colt Canada. It has wire-cutting abilities while functioning as a combat bayonet.

The bayonet itself is 311 mm long in total. It weighs 310 g and has a different scabbard and vest frog from the C7 Nella Bayonet.

The Bayonet 2000 was originally developed based on a NATO standardization agreement by AES in Germany. It uses a hilt identical to US M7 bayonet, but with a different AES design instead of replicating the entire M7 bayonet's design. It is fitted with a dark olive green grip, scabbard and olive drab green scabbard carrier. It also has web frog used to be fitted onto Modular Lightweight Load-carrying Equipment (MOLLE) system.

The Bayonet 2000 was first selected by United States Marine Corps in 2001, but was rejected due to political issues, which eventually became the lead-up to AES going bankrupt.

After the bankruptcy of AES, the bayonet was rebranded to Bayonet 2005 by Eickhorn-Solingen Ltd.

NATO Stock Number:
 Bayonet, Part No: 09653C-1 NSN 1095-20-001-6751
 Scabbard, Bayonet Part No: 09669C-1 NSN 1095-20-001-6758
 Carrier, Scabbard, Part No: 0376368-1 NSN 1095-20-001-5634

See also

 M9 Bayonet
 M16 Rifle
 List of equipment of the Canadian Army

References 

Weapons of Canada
Military equipment introduced in the 2000s
Bayonets
Military knives